The Saffarid dynasty was a Persianate dynasty of eastern Iranian origin that ruled over parts of Persia, Greater Khorasan, and eastern Makran from 861 to 1003. One of the first indigenous Persian dynasties to emerge after the Islamic conquest, the Saffarid dynasty was part of the Iranian Intermezzo. The dynasty's founder was Ya'qub bin Laith as-Saffar, who was born in 840 in a small town called Karnin (Qarnin), which was located east of Zaranj and west of Bost, in what is now Afghanistan. A native of Sistan and a local ayyār, Ya'qub worked as a coppersmith (ṣaffār) before becoming a warlord. He seized control of the Sistan region and began conquering most of Iran and Afghanistan, as well as parts of Pakistan, Tajikistan and Uzbekistan.

The Saffarids used their capital Zaranj as a base for an aggressive expansion eastward and westward. They first invaded the areas south of the Hindu Kush, and then overthrew the Tahirid dynasty, annexing Khorasan in 873. By the time of Ya'qub's death, he had conquered the Kabul Valley, Sindh, Tocharistan, Makran (Balochistan), Kerman, Fars, Khorasan, and nearly reached Baghdad but then suffered a defeat by the Abbasids.

The Saffarid dynasty did not last long after Ya'qub's death. His brother and successor, Amr bin Laith, was defeated at the Battle of Balkh against Ismail Samani in 900. Amr bin Laith was forced to surrender most of his territories to the new rulers. The Saffarids were confined to their heartland of Sistan, and with time, their role  was reduced to that of vassals of the Samanids and their successors.

Founding
The dynasty began with Ya'qub ibn al-Layth al-Saffar (Ya'qub, son of Layth, the Coppersmith), a coppersmith of eastern Iranian origins, who moved to the city of Zaranj. He left work to become an Ayyar and eventually got the power to act as an independent ruler. From his capital Zaranj he moved east into al-Rukhkhadj (Arachosia), Zamindawar and ultimately Kabul, vanquishing the Zunbils and the Hindu Shahis by 865. He then invaded Bamyan, Balkh, Badghis, and Ghor. In the name of Islam, he conquered these territories which were predominantly ruled by Buddhist tribal chiefs. He took vast amounts of plunder and slaves from this campaign.

Expansion
The Tahirid city of Herat was captured in 870, and his campaign in the Badghis region led to the capture of Kharidjites which later formed the Djash al-Shurat contingent in his army. Ya'qub then turned his focus to the west and began attacks on Khorasan, Khuzestan, Kerman (Southeastern Iran) and Fars (southwestern Iran). The Saffarids then seized Khuzestan (southwestern Iran) and parts of southern Iraq, and in 876 came close to overthrowing the Abbasids, whose army was able to turn them back only within a few days' march from Baghdad. From silver mines in the Panjshir Valley, the Saffarids were able to mint silver coins.

These incursions, however, forced the Abbasid caliphate to recognize Ya'qub as governor of Sistan, Fars and Kerman, and Saffarids were even offered key posts in Baghdad. Despite Ya'qub's military successes, he was not an empire builder since he had no concept of a centralized government.

Decline

In 901, Amr Saffari was defeated at the battle of Balkh by the Samanids, and they lost Khorasan to them. The Saffarids were reduced to the provinces of Fars, Kerman and Sistan. Under Tahir ibn Muhammad ibn Amr (901–908), the dynasty fought the Abbasids for the possession of Fars to maintain its control over the province. However, in 908, a civil war erupted between Tahir and the pretender al-Laith b. 'Ali in Sistan. In the next years, the governor of Fars, Sebük-eri defected to the Abbasids. In 912, the Samanids finally expelled the Saffarids from Sistan. Sistan passed briefly to Abbasid control, but become independent again under the Saffarid Abu Ja'far Ahmad ibn Muhammad; but now the dynasty was a minor power isolated in Sistan.

In 1002, Mahmud of Ghazni invaded Sistan, dethroned Khalaf I and finally ended the Saffarid dynasty.

Culture
The Saffarids patronized Persian language in the form of court poetry and established Persianate culture. Under their rule, the eastern Islamic world witnessed the emergence of prominent Persian poets such as Fayrouz Mashriqi, Abu Salik al-Jirjani, and Muhammad ibn Wasif, who was a court poet.

In the later 9th century, the Saffarids gave impetus to a renaissance of New Persian literature and culture. Following Ya'qub's conquest of Herat, some poets chose to celebrate his victory in Arabic, whereupon Ya'qub requested his secretary, Muhammad bin Wasif al-Sistani, to compose those verses in Persian.

Religion
The religion of the Saffarid's founder, Ya'qub, has been a topic of debate. Most of the primary sources were written during or after the fall of the Samanid dynasty and view the Saffarids through Samanid eyes. These primary sources depict Ya'qub either as a religious rascal or a volunteer Sunni warrior - a mutatawwi. The Seljuk vizier Nizam al-Mulk, obsessed with the integrity of the Seljuk Empire, depicts Ya'qub as an Ismaili convert.  

According to C.E. Bosworth, early Saffarid emirs did not appear to have significant religious beliefs. Since Kharijism prospered in Sistan longer than anywhere else in eastern Iran, it was believed the Saffarids held Kharijite sympathies. Archeologist Barry Cunliffe, states the Saffarids were Shia Muslim.

Rulers of the Saffarid dynasty

Gallery

See also
Iranian Intermezzo
Nasrid dynasty (Sistan)
Mihrabanids
Samanids
Ghaznavids
Muhammad ibn Wasif
List of kings of Persia

Notes

References

Sources

External links 

Encyclopædia Iranica Saffarids

 
States and territories established in the 860s
861 establishments
1003 disestablishments in Asia
History of Nimruz Province
Former political entities in Afghanistan